The 2016 Mid-Season Invitational was the second event of the Mid-Season Invitational (MSI), a League of Legends tournament by Riot Games. It took place from March 4 to March 15, 2016, in Shanghai Oriental Sports Center, Pudong, Shanghai, China. The participants were 6 winning teams of the Spring Seasons in their respective regions: 5 teams from North America (NA LCS), Europe (EU LCS), China (LPL), South Korea (LCK), Taiwan/Hong Kong/Macau (LMS) and a team from Wildcard regions (Brazil, CIS, Japan, Latin America, Oceania, Southeast Asia) that won the Mid-Season International Wildcard Invitational (IWCI).

SK Telecom T1 from South Korea won their first MSI title after defeating Counter Logic Gaming from North America 3–0 in the final.

Qualified teams and roster

Qualified team 

  Royal Never Give Up (2016 LPL Spring winner)
  SK Telecom T1 (2016 LCK Spring winner)
  G2 Esports (2016 EU LCS Spring winner)
  Flash Wolves  (2016 LMS Spring winner)
  Counter Logic Gaming (2016 NA LCS Spring winner)
  SuperMassive eSports (2016 TCL Winter winner, Mid-Season International Wildcard Invitational winner)

Roster

Group stage

 Double Round Robin, all matches are Best-of-one.
 Top 4 teams advance to Play-off. Bottom 2 teams are eliminated.

Knockout stage 
 The 1st-place team plays with the 4th-place team, The 2nd-place team plays with the 3rd-place team in semifinals.
Matches are Best-of-five

References

Final standings 

2010s in Shanghai
2016 in Chinese sport
2016 in esports
2016 multiplayer online battle arena tournaments
2016